Hockensmith is a surname. Notable people with the surname include:

Steve Hockensmith (born 1968), American writer
Wilbur Hockensmith (1878–1951), American football coach